The National Disease Research Interchange (NDRI), based in Philadelphia, Pennsylvania, is a not-for-profit 501(c)(3) organization founded in 1980. NDRI is funded in part by the National Institutes of Health, public and private foundations and organizations, pharmaceutical and biotechnology corporations. NDRI is a 24/7 operation that partners with a nationwide network of over 130 tissue source sites (TSS), including organ procurement organizations (OPO), tissue banks, eye banks, and hospitals.  The TSS are distributed throughout the US, in 45 states, with concentrations in major metropolitan areas on both the east and west coasts.  It serves as the liaison between procurement sources and the research community.

Funding 

The National Institutes of Health (NIH) have provided grants to NDRI since 1984. Current support for NDRI comes from several institutes within the NIH, including funding from the National Center for Research Resources, the National Eye Institute, the National Institute of Diabetes and Digestive and Kidney Diseases, the National Institute of Allergy and Infectious Diseases, the National Institute of Arthritis and Musculoskeletal and Skin Diseases, the National Heart, Lung and Blood Institute, and the Office of Rare Diseases Research. Additional support comes from voluntary health organizations and from corporate and individual donors.

References

External links 
National Disease Research Interchange

Medical research organizations
American medical research
Research organizations in the United States
Non-profit organizations based in Philadelphia
Organizations established in 1980
1980 establishments in Pennsylvania

501(c)(3) organizations